General Alvear is a  department located in the south east of Mendoza Province in Argentina.

The City of general Alvear is home to a campus of Universidad Nacional de Cuyo.

The partido and its agricultural lands are irrigated by the Rivers Diamante and Atuel.

Name

The department and its head town are named after General Carlos María de Alvear (1789-1852) a hero of the Argentine War of Independence.

History

1879, The land now forming Departamento General Alvear is conquered in the 2nd desert campaign.
1884, The lands are purchased by Diego de Alvear, son of General Carlos María de Alvear.
1912, The Departamento was officially created on August 12 and the Sarmiento Railroad arrived in the city of General Alvear.

Districts

Bowen 
General Alvear
San Pedro del Atuel

Smaller settlements

Canalejas
Carmensa
Cochicó
Colonia Alvear Oeste
Corral de Lorca
El Ceibo
El Juncalito
La Escandinava
La Mora
Línea de Poste
Los Compartos
Ovejería
Poste de Hierro

External links
My Alvear (Spanish)
Municipal site (Spanish)
Alvear Mendoza  (Spanish)
Tourist Site (Spanish)
Information about General Alvear (Spanish)
General Alvear Civil Defence (Spanish)
Universidad nacional de Cuyo (Spanish)

1912 establishments in Argentina
Departments of Mendoza Province
Populated places established in 1912